Concepción del Sur is a municipality in the Honduran department of Santa Bárbara.

Demographics
At the time of the 2013 Honduras census, Concepción del Sur municipality had a population of 5,486. Of these, 92.25% were Mestizo, 5.00% White, 2.59% Indigenous (2.46% Lenca) and 0.16% Black or Afro-Honduran.

References

Municipalities of the Santa Bárbara Department, Honduras